This is an annotated list of notable records from United Kingdom general elections from 1945 onwards (with certain exceptions).

Rationale
This article limits itself to records for 1945 and onwards. Prior to 1945, electoral competition in the United Kingdom exhibited features which make meaningful comparisons with modern results difficult.

Among the most significant were:

Frequent interventions and withdrawals of parties in different seats.
Frequent coalitions between parties, splits within parties and floor-crossing by members.
Uncontested elections and truces between parties, in particular during both world wars.
Generally more significant competition from independent candidates and minor parties.
Multi-member seats and university seats.
Higher frequency of general elections, although parliaments were extended during both world wars.
Generally higher turnouts.
Generally higher variation in size of constituency electorates.

Since 1945, the evolution of a stable 3-party system has tended to negate each of the above features so that, broadly speaking, elections are more comparable.

In Northern Ireland, as ever, the pattern of party competition is completely different from that in Great Britain and comparisons remain problematic.

Hence, unless otherwise stated records are based on results since the 1945 general election, and earlier exceptional results are listed separately.

Glossary
For comparison purposes the following definitions have been adopted.

Gain – victory by a party which was not victorious at the immediate previous election.
Loss – defeat of a party which was victorious at the immediate previous election.
Hold – victory by a party which was victorious at the immediate previous election.
Win – victory by a party. Ambiguous term that could mean either a gain or a hold.
Incumbent – the party which held the seat at the immediate previous election, irrespective of any intervening change of candidate or candidate's change of party.
Third party – In England, since 1922, the "third party" has been the Liberal party through its Alliance with the SDP and their successors up to the present day Liberal Democrats. Additionally, in Scotland and Wales the Scottish National Party and Plaid Cymru are also considered to be third parties. Prior to 1922, the third party was the Labour party.
Minor party – parties smaller than the third party
Uncontested – an election where only one candidate is put forward. No votes are actually cast and the candidate is by default the victor.
Notional – boundary changes occur about every 10–15 years. Invariably the political composition of many seats is changed as a result, sometimes decisively. Professors Colin Rallings and Michael Thrasher have compiled notional results for the last few sets of boundary changes, predicting what the result would have been at the previous election under the new boundaries. While accurate overall, the results in a few seats indicate that they may have been mistaken.

Numerical records

For more information about what is meant by the term "swing", see Swing (politics)

Largest swings

National swings
1931 general election – 14.4% swing from Labour to National Government
1945 general election – 11.8% swing from Conservative/National Liberal to Labour
1997 general election – 10.2% swing from Conservative to Labour
1906 general election – 5.4% swing from Conservative to Liberal
1979 general election – 5.3% swing from Labour to Conservative
2010 general election – 5.1% swing from Labour to Conservative

From Conservative to Labour
Brent North, 1997 – 18.8% (Labour gain)

From Labour to Conservative
Bassetlaw, 2019 – 18.4% (Conservative gain)

From Labour to Liberal Democrat
Brent East, 2005 – 29% (Liberal Democrat gain)

From Labour to SNP
Glasgow North East, 2015 – 39.3% (SNP gain)

From Liberal Democrat to Labour
Brent Central, 2015 – 28.3% (Labour gain)

From SNP to Conservative 

 Gordon, 2017 –  20.4% (Conservative gain)

Largest fall in percentage share of vote
A party's share of the vote at a general election is not always matched at subsequent general elections, but given the five-year maximum term of a Parliament since 1911, reductions of 10% or more (on the national level) or around 30% or more (in individual constituencies) are unusual.

National

Constituency

Other parties
The Scottish National and Democratic Unionist parties have never lost a 30% or larger percentage share of the vote in a single constituency.

Largest increase in percentage share of vote

These records detail the change in the share of the vote by parties when compared to the same constituency in the previous general election. In some cases, such as Brent East in 2005 for the Liberal Democrats, the figures should be framed by the context of a by-election in that constituency between the two elections.

Other parties

Largest winning share of the vote
The five largest shares of the vote won by any candidate, since 1918, are as follows:

Largest number of votes 
The most votes received by a single individual in a general election was Sir Cooper Rawson who polled 75,205 votes when being reelected as MP for Brighton in 1931. Brighton was a two-member constituency with a larger than average electorate. The most votes received by an individual in a single-seat constituency was 69,762 for Reginald Blair in Hendon in 1935.

Largest majority
The largest majority received by an individual is also Sir Cooper Rawson, reelected with a majority of 62,253 (35.2% of votes) at Brighton in 1931. The largest majority received by a woman is 38,823 (71.4% of votes) by the Countess of Iveagh elected MP for Southend in 1931.

Lowest winning share of the vote
All general election victors receiving less than 33.33% of the vote are listed. The list is complete from 1945 onwards. Seats with more than one member are omitted.

Lowest share of the vote

Major parties less than 1% of the vote
Since 1918:

The Conservatives' worst vote outside Northern Ireland was 1.1% for A. Seaton in Pontypridd in 1918.

Labour's worst vote was 2.2% for Samuel McLaren in Glasgow Bridgeton in 1935 and in 2010 for Jonathan Todd in Westmorland and Lonsdale.

Candidates winning fewer than ten votes
Candidates in general elections since 1918 who won fewer than ten votes:

Both W. M. Somerville in Bewdley at the 1874 United Kingdom general election and F. R. Lees in Drogheda at the 1852 United Kingdom general election received no votes.

Smallest majorities

Since 1945
Notes:

Most recounts
7: Peterborough, 1966
7: Brighton Kemptown, 1964
6: Hyndburn, 1983
5: Hastings and Rye,  2017
5: Carmarthen, February 1974
5: Ilkeston, 1931

Highest turnout
Highest turnouts in any general election since 1918:

Fermanagh and South Tyrone, 1951: 93.4%
Darwen, 1924: 92.7%

Lowest turnout
All turnouts below 35% from 1918 onwards:

Until 2001, the lowest turnout after 1918 was 37.4% in Orkney and Shetland in 1922.

Most candidates

Any number of candidates can be nominated for election under current UK electoral law. The only restrictions are that a candidate must be a Commonwealth or Irish citizen, not legally disqualified, with the valid nomination of ten electors from the constituency. Candidates must pay a £500 deposit which is only refunded if the candidate wins 5% or more of the votes cast.

Fourteen constituencies have seen more than ten candidates stand in a general election:

Bold indicates incumbent was Prime Minister in the parliament prior to that election

Before 1983, the consecutive records were 6 candidates in Paddington North in 1918, 7 in Tottenham in February 1974 and 9 in Devon North in 1979.

Fewest candidates
The last four seats to be uncontested at a general election were Armagh, Londonderry, North Antrim and South Antrim, at the 1951 general election. The last seats in Great Britain to be uncontested were Liverpool Scotland and Rhondda West, at the 1945 general election.

Three seats were contested only by Labour and Conservative candidates at the 1979 general election: Birmingham Handsworth, Dudley West and Salford East.

Buckingham was the only seat contested by only three candidates at the 2015 general election. Traditionally, the Speaker of the House of Commons is not opposed by major parties, so the only opposition to John Bercow was candidates from the Green Party and from UKIP. However, in the 2017 United Kingdom general election, there were 21 seats with only three candidates and in 2019 there were 20.

Candidate records

Durable general election candidates
A selection of politicians who have contested seats in at least thirteen general elections are listed:

MPs defeated at consecutive general elections
On rare occasions, an MP has been defeated at a general election, returned at a by-election, only to be defeated again at the subsequent general election. Shirley Williams is distinguished by achieving this while in two different parties.
George Galloway, 2010 and 2015
William McCrea, 1997 and 2001a
Shirley Williams, 1979 and 1983
Christopher Addison, 1931 and 1935
Arthur Henderson, 1918, 1922 and 1923b

Notes:
a returned to Parliament at a subsequent general election
b returned to Parliament at a subsequent by-election

Former MPs unsuccessful at subsequent general elections

Attempts
It is unusual for a defeated MP to pursue more than a couple of attempts at re-election.
9: Robert McIntyre, 1950, 1951, 1955, 1959, 1964, 1966, 1970, Feb 1974 and Oct 1974a
5: Dave Nellist, 1997, 2001, 2005, 2010 and 2015a
6: George Nicholls, Dec 1910, 1918, 1922, 1923, 1924 and 1929 (and by-elections in 1913 and 1925)a
4: Fred Maddison, Dec 1910, 1918, 1922 and 1923a
4: Tom Howard, 1935, 1945, 1950 and 1951 (and a by-election in 1947)e
3: Mike Carr, 1997, 2001 and 2005a
3: Tom Mitchell, 1959, 1964 and 1966b
3: Sydney Walter Robinson, 1929, 1931 and 1945 (and a by-election in 1926)a
3: Maurice Alexander, 1923, 1924, 1931e
3: Thomas Edward Wing, 1922, 1924 and 1929 (and a by-election in 1920)c
3: Alexander Boulton, Dec 1910, 1923 and 1924d

Notes:
a in various seats
b in the same seat
c two previous seats and another
d one previous seat and another
e one previous seat and others

Interval
Attempts at a comeback usually occur almost immediately. Those who succeeded after further general elections include:

Future MPs unsuccessful at previous general elections
It is unusual for a candidate who has been unsuccessful on more than a couple of occasions to finally win a seat.
Roger Mullin, elected for Kirkcaldy and Cowdenbeath in 2015, after standing in South Ayrshire in February 1974 and October 1974, Kirkcaldy in 1987, Paisley North in a by-election in 1990 and in 1992.
David Ward, elected for Bradford East in 2010, after standing in Bradford North in 1992, 2001 and 2005 (and a by-election in 1990).
Alasdair McDonnell, elected for Belfast South in 2005, after standing in 1979, 1983, 1987, 1992, 1997 and 2001 (and a by-election in 1982), and previously in North Antrim in 1970.
Gregory Campbell, elected for East Londonderry in 2001, after standing in 1997, and previously in Foyle in 1983, 1987 and 1992.
Martin McGuinness, elected for Mid Ulster in 1997, after standing in Foyle in 1983, 1987 and 1992.
Michael Ward, elected for Peterborough in October 1974, after standing in February 1974, 1970 and 1966.
Tommy Lewis, elected for Southampton in 1929, after standing in 1918, 1922, 1923 and 1924.
A. E. Stubbs, elected for Cambridgeshire in 1945, after standing in 1918, 1922 and 1923, and in another constituency in 1929, 1931 and 1935.
Frank Smith, elected for Nuneaton in 1929, after standing in 1924, and in various other constituencies in 1923, 1922, 1918, 1910, 1895 and 1892 (and also two by-elections in 1909 and one in 1894).
Edwin Scrymgeour, elected for Dundee in 1922, after standing in January 1910, December 1910 and 1918 (and also in the 1908 and 1917 by-elections).
Daniel Zeichner, elected for Cambridge in 2015, after standing in 2010, and previously in Mid Norfolk in 2005, 2001 and 1997.
Among women, namely:
Felicity Buchan, elected for Kensington in 2019, after previously standing in South Shields in 2017 and South Down in 2015.
Theodora Clarke, elected for Stafford in 2019, after previously standing in Bristol East in 2017 and 2015.
Daisy Cooper, elected for St Albans in 2019, after standing in 2017, and previously in Mid Sussex in 2015 and Suffolk Coastal in 2010.
Dehenna Davison, elected for Bishop Auckland in 2019, after standing in Sedgefield in 2017 and Kingston upon Hull North in 2015.
Jane Hunt, elected for Loughbrough in 2019, after standing in Nottingham South in 2017 and 2015, and Leicester East in 2010 (and also a 2011 by-election).
Wera Hobhouse, elected for Bath in 2017, after standing in North East Somerset in 2015 and Heywood and Middleton in 2010.
Nicky Morgan, elected for Loughborough in 2010, after standing in 2005, and previously in Islington South and Finsbury in 2001.
Tessa Munt, elected for Wells in 2010, after standing in 2005, and previously in South Suffolk in 2001 (and also a by-election that year).
Liz Truss, elected for South West Norfolk in 2010, after standing in Calder Valley in 2005 and Hemsworth in 2001.
Rosie Cooper, elected for West Lancashire in 2005, after standing in Liverpool Broadgreen in 1992, Knowsley North in 1987 (and also a 1986 by-election) and Liverpool Garston in 1983.
Ann Keen, elected for Brentford and Isleworth in 1997, after standing in 1992 and 1987.
Siobhain McDonagh, elected for Mitcham and Morden in 1997, after standing in 1992 and 1987.
Margaret Thatcher, elected for Finchley in 1959, after previously standing in Dartford as Margaret Roberts in 1951 and 1950.
Barbara Ayrton-Gould, elected for Hendon North in 1945, after standing in Manchester Hulme in 1935, Northwich in 1929 and 1924, and Lambeth North in 1922.
Grace Colman, elected for Tynemouth in 1945, after standing in Sheffield Hallam in 1935 and Hythe in 1931 and 1929.
Jean Mann, elected for Coatbridge in 1945, after standing in West Renfrewshire in 1935 and 1931.
Ethel Bentham, elected for Islington East in 1929, after standing in 1924, 1923 and 1922.
Helen Shaw, elected for Bothwell in 1929, after standing in 1924 and 1923.

Former MPs making a comeback at a general election
 2019: Caroline Ansell, James Davies, Flick Drummond, Margaret Ferrier, Richard Fuller, Jason McCartney, Karl McCartney, Anne McLaughlin, John Nicolson, Sarah Olney, Kirsten Oswald, Amanda Solloway, Owen Thompson, Edward Timpson, Craig Williams
 2017: Vince Cable, Ed Davey, David Drew, Michelle Gildernew, Zac Goldsmith, John Grogan, Stephen Lloyd, Tony Lloyd, Esther McVey, Chris Ruane, Jo Swinson, Chris Williamson
 2015: Boris Johnson, Joan Ryan, Dawn Butler, Rob Marris, Alex Salmond
 2010: John Cryer, Geraint Davies, Jonathan Evans, Chris Leslie, Stephen Twigg
 2005: David Evennett, Christopher Fraser, William McCrea, Malcolm Rifkind
 2001: Henry Bellingham, Alistair Burt, Derek Conway, Charles Hendry, Greg Knight, Andrew Mitchell, Bob Spink
 1997: Gerry Adams, Christopher Chope, Alan Clark, Frank Doran, Huw Edwards, Michael Fallon, Ronnie Fearn, Mike Hancock, Sylvia Heal, Gerald Howarth, Ashok Kumar, Richard Livsey, Humfrey Malins, John Maples, Francis Maude, Jonathan Sayeed, John Smith
 1992: Michael Ancram, Bryan Davies, Warren Hawksley, John Horam, Gerry Malone, Piers Merchant, Richard Ottaway, Nick Raynsford, John Spellar, Derek Spencer, Iain Sproat, Mark Robinson, Paul Tyler
 1987: Bob Cryer, Margaret Ewing, John Garrett, Bruce Grocott, Joan Lestor, Jim Marshall, Ann Taylor, Andrew Welsh, Audrey Wise
 1983: Margaret Beckett, Robin Corbett, Bryan Gould, Edward Loyden, Andrew MacKay, Max Madden, Brian Sedgemore
 1979: Michael Ancram, Sydney Chapman, David Clark, Eric Cockeram, Ednyfed Hudson Davies, Terry Davis, Dick Douglas, Peggy Fenner, Peter Griffiths, John Gummer, Barry Henderson, James Hill, John Wilkinson, David Winnick
 October 1974: Donald Anderson, Jeremy Bray, Gwynfor Evans, Robert Hicks, Evan Luard, John Mackintosh, Fergus Montgomery, Enoch Powell, Nicholas Scott, Keith Speed
 February 1974 Ronald Atkins, Gwyneth Dunwoody, John Ellis, David Ennals, Ioan Evans, Winifred Ewing, Gerald Fowler, Frank Hooley, Sydney Irving, Colin Jackson, John Lee, Eric Moonman, Stanley Newens, Christopher Price, Gwilym Roberts, Arnold Shaw, Frederick Silvester, Richard Wainwright, Alan Lee Williams, Michael Winstanley
 1970: William Clark, Albert Cooper, Julian Critchley, Charles Curran, Patrick Duffy, Anthony Fell, Edward Gardner, Alan Glyn, Alan Green, Patricia Hornsby-Smith, Geoffrey Howe, James Kilfedder, Martin McLaren, Anthony Meyer, Peter Thomas, Richard Thompson, David Walder, Montague Woodhouse
 1966: Richard Body, Peter Tapsell

Shortest-serving general election victors
For a comprehensive list of MPs with total service of less than 365 days see List of United Kingdom MPs with the shortest service

Since 1945

Pre-1945

Notes
1 died
2 defeated at next general election
3 disqualified
4 resigned
5 succeeded to the Peerage
a returned to Parliament at a subsequent election
b had served previously as an MP
x elected on abstentionist tickets, and serving jail sentences at the time, so the calculated length of service is somewhat theoretical.

Youngest general election victors

 Mhairi Black, Scottish National Party, elected in 2015 aged 20 years 237 days.

Babies of the House elected at general elections

See Baby of the House of Commons

Youngest to leave the House

Notes:
1 Defeated
2 Constituency abolished
3 Retired
x did not take his seat

Oldest to lose their seats

1Based on Hardie's earliest estimated birth year of "c. 1860", although some biographers cite a date as late as 27 January 1871, making him only 60 years old at time of that election.

Oldest general election victors

At first election
Possibly the oldest known first-time seat winner was Bernard Kelly (born 1808) who was aged 77 when he became the first MP for the then new seat of South Donegal in Ireland at the 1885 general election. He died aged reportedly 78 on 1 January 1887. Others:

Caleb Wright, 1885: 75
Sir George Harrison, 1885: 741
Frank Smith, 1929: 74
William Beadel, 1885: 73
Ashton Lister, 1918: 73
Robert Williams, 1807: 71
Sir John Elley, 1835: 71
John Fleming, 1818: 70–712
James Caulfeild, 1852: 70
Frank James, 1892: 70
Samuel Young, 1892: 70
Robert Cameron, 1895: 703
George Walker, 1945: 704
Piara Khabra, 1992: 705
William Cobbett, 1832: 69
Robert Brooks, 1859: 69
Robert Stickney Blaine, 1885: 69
Sir Robert Hobart, 1906: 69
Sir William Peter Griggs, 1918: 69
Sir George Andreas Berry, 1922: 69
Alfred Smith, 1929: 69
Sir William Earle Welby, 1802: 68
William Nicol, 1859: 68
William Raeburn, 1918: 68
Sir Alfred Waldron Smithers, 1918: 68
Ethel Bentham, 1929: 68
Marie Rimmer, 2015: 68
Mick Whitley, 2019: 68
George Williams, 1832: 67
Sir George Berkeley, 1852: 67
William Henry Sykes, 1857: 67
William John Lysley, 1859: 67
Spencer Charrington, 1885: 67
Henry Howe Bemrose, 1895: 67
Sir Maurice Dockrell, 1918: 67
Edwin Perkins, 1922: 67
Andrew Gilzean, 1945: 67
Albert Stubbs, 1945: 67
John McQuade, 1979: 67
Ernest Roberts, 1979: 67
Roger Mullin, 2015, 67
Jo Gideon, 2019: 67
John Forster FitzGerald, 1852: 66–67
William Beckett, 1841: 66
Sir Benjamin Guinness, 1865: 66
Dadabhai Naoroji, 1892: 66
William Beale, 1906: 66
George Henry Faber, 1906: 66
David Sanders Davies, 1918: 66
Henry Foreman, 1918: 66
Marshall Stevens, 1918: 66
Albert Edward Jacob, 1924: 66
Sir Frederick Mills, 1931: 66
William Allan Reid, 1931: 66
Richard Taylor, 2001: 66
Gordon Birtwistle, 2010: 66
Glyn Davies, 2010: 66
Marion Fellows, 2015: 66
William Moffat, 1802: 65
James Simmons, 1806: 65
Peter Rainier, 1807: 65
Thomas Bernard, 1874: 65
Hugh Law, 1874: 65
Alfred Lafone, 1886: 65
Robert Pearce, 1906: 65
Alexander Sprot, 1918: 65
Joseph Leckie, 1931: 65
Caroline Ganley, 1945: 65
Mervyn Wheatley, 1945: 65
George Kerevan, 2015, 65

1 Exact birth date not known but Harrison was reportedly this age when he died 5 days after the general election closed and before he took his seat.
2 Exact birth date not known but Fleming, who was brought up as an adopted orphan, is usually stated to have been born in 1747.
3 Exact birthdate not known but Cameron is normally stated to have been born in 1825 and was reportedly this age at election.
4 Exact birthdate not known but Walker is normally stated to have born in 1874 and was reportedly this age at election.
5 Khabra's exact age has been the subject of some disagreement. He claimed a birth year of 1924, which would have made him 67 years old at first election, but his marriage certificate gives a birth year of 1921, and it is this figure which has been used above.

At last election
Charles Pelham Villiers, Wolverhampton South, 1895: 93
Samuel Young, East Cavan, 1910(D): 88
David Logan, Liverpool Scotland, 1959: 87
Sir Charles Burrell, New Shoreham, 1859: 85
Isaac Holden, Keighley, 1892: 85
Robert Cameron, Houghton-le-Spring, 1910(D): 85
Dennis Skinner, Bolsover, 2017: 85
Walter Wilkins, Radnorshire, 1826: 84
William Hodgson Barrow, South Nottinghamshire, 1868: 84
Winston Churchill, Woodford, 1959: 84
Gerald Kaufman, Manchester Gorton, 2015: 84
William Plumer, Higham Ferrers, 1820: 83
Christopher Rice Mansel Talbot, Mid Glamorganshire, 1886: 83
S. O. Davies, Merthyr Tydfil, 1970: 83 1
Piara Khabra, Ealing Southall, 2005: 83
The Earl of Carhampton, Ludgershall, 1820: 82
William Ewart Gladstone, Midlothian, 1892: 82
Paul Flynn, Newport West, 2017: 82
Sir Thomas Miller, Portsmouth, 1812: 81
Manny Shinwell, Easington, 1966: 81
John Rankin, Glasgow Govan, 1970: 81
David Winnick, Walsall North, 2015: 81
Whitshed Keene, Montgomery Boroughs, 1812: c.80–812
Sir John Aubrey, Horsham, 1820: 80
William Gore-Langton, Somerset East, 1841: 80
Lord Palmerston, Tiverton, 1865: 80
Joseph Warner Henley, Oxfordshire, 1874: 80
Michael Thomas Bass, Derby, 1880: 80
James Patrick Mahon, Clare, 1880: 80
Sir Gilbert Greenall, Warrington, 1886: 80
John Mowbray, Oxford University, 1895: 80
John Rankin, Glasgow Govan, 1970: 80
Edward Heath, Old Bexley and Sidcup, 1997: 80
Peter Tapsell, Louth and Horncastle, 2010: 80
Ann Clwyd, Cynon Valley, 2017: 80
Murdoch Macdonald, Inverness, 1945: 79
Ian Paisley, Antrim North, 2005: 79
Geoffrey Robinson, Coventry North-West, 2017: 79
Bill Cash, Stone, 2019: 79
Margaret Beckett, Derby South, 2019: 76
Alice Cullen, Glasgow Gorbals, 1966: 75
Irene Ward, Tynemouth, 1970: 75
Gwyneth Dunwoody, Crewe and Nantwich, 2005: 74
Eleanor Rathbone, Combined English Universities, 1945: 73
Glenda Jackson, Hampstead and Kilburn, 2010: 73
Angela Watkinson, Hornchurch and Upminster, 2015: 73
Marie Rimmer, St Helens South and Whiston, 2019: 72
Louise Ellman, Liverpool Riverside, 2017: 71
Caroline Ganley, Battersea South, 1950: 70
Ann Coffey, Stockport, 2017: 70
Kate Hoey, Vauxhall, 2017: 70

1 Davies was suspected of being considerably older than he claimed. There is evidence to suggest he was born in 1879, not 1886; if true, this would indicate he was 90 at his last election.
2 Keene's birthdate is given as "c. 1731" in reference works though he was reportedly 90 years old on his death in February 1822. On this the figure is based. Unopposed return, his last contested election was in 1802 when aged 70–71.

 Note: All men aged 79 or over since 1945 and over 85 since 1900 are listed, as are all women aged 70 or over.

Returning to the house after a gap 
A contender for the longest gap prior to returning at a general election was possibly Henry Drummond (1786–1860), who returned to the House of Commons in the 1847 general election as member for West Surrey, after a near 35-year absence, though aged only 60. He was previously MP for Plympton Erle from 1810–12.

Others, who returned at older ages than Drummond's:
Sir Gilbert Greenall was 79 when he returned to the house in 1885, after a 5-year absence, as the member for Warrington, for which he previously sat from 1874–1880.
Robert Carden was 78 when he returned to the house in 1880, after a 21-year absence, as the member for Barnstaple. He had sat for Gloucester from 1857–59.
Sir Harry Verney was 78 when he returned to the house in 1880, after a 6-year absence, as the member for Buckingham, for which he previously sat from 1857–74.
Sir John Chetwode was 77 when he returned to the house in 1841, after a 22-year absence, as member for Buckingham. He was previously MP for Newcastle-under-Lyme in 1815–18.
Sir John Baker was 77 when he returned to the house in 1906, after a 5-year absence, as member for Portsmouth, for which he previously sat in 1892–1900.
Sir Richard Green-Price was 76 when he returned to the house in 1880, after an 11-year absence, as member for Radnorshire. He had previously sat for Radnor Boroughs 1863–69.
Sir Mark MacTaggart-Stewart was 75 when he returned to the house in January 1910 after a 4-year absence, as member for Kirkcudbrightshire, for which he previously sat in 1885–1906.
John Courtenay was 74 when he returned to the house in 1812, after a 5-year absence, as member for Appleby, which he had previously sat for until 1807.
Thomas Perronet Thompson was 74 when he returned to the house in 1857, after a four year absence, as member of Bradford, for which he previously sat in 1846-52.
Alfred Lafone was 74 when he returned to the house in 1895, after a three-year absence, as member for Bermondsey, for which he previously sat in 1886–92.
John Potts was 74 when he returned to the house in 1935, after a four-year absence. He had sat for Barnsley from 1922–31.
Vince Cable was 74 when he returned to the house in 2017, after a 2-year absence, as member for Twickenham, for which he previously sat in 1997–2015.
George Edwards was 73 when he returned to the house in 1923, after a year's absence, as member for South Norfolk, for which he previously sat in 1920–22.
James Barr was 73 when he returned to the house in 1935 as MP for Coatbridge, after four years' absence. He was previously MP for Motherwell 1924–31.
William Kirk was 72 or 73 when he returned to the house in 1868, after a 9-year absence, as member for Newry, for which he previously sat in 1852–59.
Sir Nathaniel Dance-Holland was 72 when he returned to the house in 1807 as MP for East Grinstead, after five months' absence. He was previously MP for Great Bedwyn 1802–06, and East Grinstead before then.
Sir Davison Dalziel was 72 when he returned to the house in 1924 as MP for Brixton, after nearly a year's absence. He previously sat for the same seat in 1910–23.
Arthur Shirley Benn was 72 when he returned to the house in 1931 as MP for Sheffield Park, after two years' absence. He previously sat for Plymouth Drake in 1918–29.
Joseph Alpass was 72 when he returned to the house in 1945 as MP for Thornbury, after 13 years absence. He previously sat for Bristol Central in 1929–31.
Cahir Healy was 72 when he returned to the house in 1950, after a 15-year voluntary absence, as member for Fermanagh and South Tyrone. He had sat for the predecessor constituency between 1922–24 and 1931–35.
John Arthur Roebuck was 71 when he returned to the house in 1874, after a 6-year absence, as member for Sheffield, for which he previously sat in 1847–68.
Mathew Wilson was 71 when he returned to the house in 1874, after a 20-year absence, as member for Northern West Riding of Yorkshire. He had previously sat in two periods for Clitheroe between 1841–53.
Sir Alexander Sprot was 71 when he returned to the house in 1924 after nearly two years' absence, as member for North Lanarkshire. He had previously sat for East Fife in 1918–22.
Tommy Lewis was 71 when he returned to the house after a 14-year absence in 1945, as member for Southampton, for which he previously sat between 1929–31.
William Gore-Langton was 70 when he returned to the house after a five-year absence in 1831, as member for Somerset which he previously represented until 1826.
Edward Greene was 70 when he returned to the house after seven months' absence in 1886 United Kingdom general election, as member for Stowmarket. He had been MP for Bury St Edmunds until 1885.
William Joseph Corbet was 70 when he returned to the house after a three-year absence in 1895, as member for East Wicklow, for which he previously sat in 1885–92.
Charles James Monk was 70 when he returned to the house after nearly 10-year absence in 1895, as member for Gloucester. He previously sat for the borough constituency of that name in two periods between 1859 and 1885.
Edward Reed was 70 when he returned to the house after a 5-year absence in 1900, as member for Cardiff, for which he previously sat in 1880–95.
Robert Pearce was 70 when he returned to the house after nearly a year's absence in December 1910, as member for Leek, for which he previously sat between 1906 and January 1910.
John Ashley Warre was 69 when he returned to the house after a 23-year absence in 1857, as member for Ripon. He previously sat for Hastings in 1831–34.
Henry Eaton was 69 when he returned to the house after a 5-year absence in 1885, as member for Coventry, for which he previously sat in 1865–80.
Samuel Storey was 69 when he returned to the house after a 14-year absence in January 1910, as member for Sunderland, for which he previously sat in 1881–95.
Harry Foster was 69 when he returned to the house after 13 years absence in 1924, as member for Portsmouth Central. He was previously MP for Lowestoft in two periods between 1892 and 1910.
Alan Clark was 69 when he returned to the house after a 5-year absence in 1997, as member for Kensington and Chelsea. He previously sat for Plymouth Sutton between 1974–92.
William Mitford was 68 when he returned to the house after a 6-year absence in 1812, as member for New Romney. He previously sat for Bere Alston until 1806.
John Charles Herries was 68 when he returned to the house after a 6-year absence in 1847, as member for Stamford. He previously sat for Harwich between 1823–41.
Philip Pleydell-Bouverie was 68 when he returned to the house after a 24-year absence in 1857 as member for Berkshire. He was previously MP for Downton 1831–32.
George Clive was 68 when he returned to the house after a 5-year absence in 1874, as member for Hereford, for which he previously sat in 1857–68.
John Hubbard was 68 when he returned to the house after a 5-year absence in 1874, as member for the City of London. He was previously MP for Buckingham in 1859–68.
J. T. Hibbert was 68 when he returned to the house after a 6-year absence in 1892, as member for Oldham, for which he previously sat in 1877–86.
George Renwick was 68 when he returned to the house after an 8-year absence in 1918, as member for Newcastle upon Tyne Central. He had previously sat for the undivided Newcastle upon Tyne seat in two periods between 1900 and 1910.
Sir Alfred Law was 68 when he returned to the house after a 7-year absence in 1929, as member for High Peak. He was previously M.P. for Rochdale in 1918–22.
Sir Harry Burrard-Neale was 67 when he returned to the house after an absence of 9 years, in 1832, as member for Lymington, for which he previously sat on several occasions, the last ending in 1823.
Sir Frederick Smith was 67 when he returned to the house after an absence of 4 years, in 1857, as member for Chatham, for which he previously sat in 1852–53.
Sir Henry Bulwer was 67 when he returned to the house after a voluntary absence of 21 years, in 1868 as member for Tamworth. He was previously MP for Marylebone in 1835–37.
Somerville Hastings was 67 when he returned after a 14-year absence in 1945, as member for Barking. He had previously been MP for Reading in 1923–24 and 1929–31.
Tony Lloyd was 67 when he returned after a 5-year absence in 2017 as member for Rochdale. He had previously sat as MP for Manchester Central in 1997–2012.
Sir George Philips was 66 when he returned after a two years absence in 1832 as member for South Warwickshire. He was previously MP for Wootton Bassett 1820–30.
Alfred Billson was 66 when he returned after a 5-year absence in 1906 as member for North West Staffordshire. He had previously sat as MP for Halifax in 1897–1900.
Sir Thomas Bramsdon was 66 when he returned after a year's absence in 1923, as member for Portsmouth Central, for which he previously sat between 1918–22.
J.R. Clynes was 66 when he returned after 4 years' absence in 1935, as member for Manchester Platting, for which he previously sat 1906-31
Arthur Hayday was 66 when he returned after 4 years' absence in 1935, as member for Nottingham West, for which he previously sat in 1918–31.
Jack Kinley was 66 when he returned after 14 years' absence in 1945, as member for Bootle, for which he previously sat in 1929–31.
Robert Aglionby Slaney was 65 when he returned after near 5-year's absence in 1857, as member for Shrewsbury, for which he had previously sat in three periods between 1826 and 1852.
Joseph Arch was 65 when he returned after 6 years absence in 1892 as member for North West Norfolk, for which he previously sat in 1885-86.
Arthur Hayter was 65 when he returned after 5 years absence in 1900, as member for Walsall, for which he had previously sat in 1893–95.
John Barker was 65 when he returned after nearly 5 years absence in 1906 as member for Penryn and Falmouth. He was previously MP for Maidstone in 1900–01.
David Marshall Mason was 65 when he returned after 13 years absence in 1931 as member for Edinburgh East. He was previously MP for Coventry 1910–18.
Sir Herbert Williams was 65 when he returned after 4 years absence in 1950 for Croydon East. He was previously MP for Croydon South 1932-45.
David Drew was 65 when he returned after 7 years absence in 2017, as member for Stroud, for which he had previously sat between 1997–2010.

First women general election victors
Constance Markievicz, Dublin St Patrick's, 1918 – but did not take her seat.
Nancy Astor, Plymouth Sutton,y and Margaret Wintringham, Louth,z 1922 – both first to take their seats after a general election.

Notes:
y had entered parliament in by-election 1919
z had entered parliament in by-election 1921

First ethnic minority general election victors
Dadabhai Naoroji, Finsbury Central, 1892
Mancherjee Bhownagree, Bethnal Green, 1895 and 1900
Shapurji Saklatvala, Battersea North, 1922 and 1924
Diane Abbott, first woman to win, Hackney North and Stoke Newington, 1987

First general election victors from specific religions
When the UK Parliament was established in 1801, non-Anglicans were prevented from taking their seats as MPs under the Test Act 1672. However, Methodists took communion at Anglican churches until 1795, and some continued to do so, and many Presbyterians were prepared to accept Anglican communion, thus ensuring that members of these creeds were represented in the Parliament. Some Unitarians were also elected.

The first Roman Catholic general election victors in the UK Parliament were at the 1830 general election. They included Daniel O'Connell and James Patrick Mahon in Clare.

The first Quaker general election victor was Edward Pease at the 1832 general election.

The first Moravian general election victor was Charles Hindley at the 1835 general election.

Lionel de Rothschild was the first Jewish general election victor at the 1847 general election. He was not permitted to take his seat until the passage of the Jews Relief Act 1858.

The first Catholic Apostolic general election victor was Henry Drummond also at the 1847 election.

The first Baptist general election victor was George Goodman at the 1852 general election.

The first Congregationalist general election victor was Samuel Morley at the 1865 general election.

The first declared atheist to win a general election was Charles Bradlaugh at the 1880 general election. He was not permitted to take his seat in that parliament, but was elected again at the 1885 general election and allowed to take the oath.

Dadabhai Naoroji was the first Parsi general election victor at the 1892 general election.

Piara Khabra became the first Sikh general election victor at the 1992 general election.

Terry Rooney became the first Mormon general election victor at the 1992 general election (previously taking his seat at a by-election in 1990).

The first Muslim general election victor was Mohammed Sarwar at the 1997 general election.

The first Hindu general election victor was Shailesh Vara at the 2005 general election.

The first Buddhist general election victor was Suella Braverman as Suella Fernandes at the 2015 general election.

General elections losers awarded seats on disqualification of winner
Lord Robert Grosvenor: Fermanagh and South Tyrone, 1955

Two or more sitting MPs contest general election 
It is of course common for former (defeated) MPs to seek re-election, often in their old constituencies, especially if they are marginal or bellwether seats. What is quite unusual is for two MPs both sitting in the same parliament to seek re-election in the same seat. This usually occurs by reason of boundary changes or party splits.

Italics indicates constituency was newly created at that election
Bold indicates the candidate who won that constituency's seat at that election

Notes: 1after announcing his retirement as member for Central Fife, long-serving Scottish Labour MP Willie Hamilton obtained his party's nomination in the hopeless prospect of South Hams in southern England. Hamilton insisted that he knew local parties often found themselves without candidates shortly before nominations closed, and was offering because it would help them out of difficulty; however by standing again and being "defeated" he qualified for an additional allowance.

Frequency and duration records

Longest period without a general election
The longest possible duration of a Parliament is currently five years. All period of six years or more between general elections are listed:

9 years, 7 months and 21 days: 1935 – 1945
8 years: December 1910 – 1918
6 years: 1820 – 1826
6 years: 1841 – 1847
6 years: 1859 – 1865
6 years: 1874 – 1880
6 years: 1886 – 1892

Shortest period between general elections
All periods of less than a year between general elections are listed:

7 months: November 1806 – June 1807
7 months: November/December 1885 – July 1886
7 months and 12 days: February – October 1974
8 months: September 1830 – April/May/June 1831
10 months: December 1923 – October 1924
11 months: January – December 1910

Longest continuous governments
This details the longest continuous government of each of the parties that have been in power.

a The parties making up the National Government changed throughout this period

Election days
Currently, all British Parliamentary elections are invariably held on a Thursday. The last general election not held on a Thursday was the 1931 election, which was held on Tuesday 27 October. Prior to this, it was common to hold general elections on any day of the week (other than Sunday), and until the 1918 general election, polling (and the declaration of results) was held over a period of several weeks.

Suspended elections
On rare occasions, polling in an individual constituency may be suspended, usually as a result of the death of a candidate. The last occasion was at Thirsk and Malton in 2010, where polling was delayed for three weeks owing to the death of the UKIP candidate.

Previous examples occurred at
South Staffordshire, 2005
Barnsley, 1951
Manchester Moss Side, 1950
Kingston upon Hull Central, 1945
Rugby, 1929
West Derbyshire, 1923
Kennington, 1918

Causes of general elections

Loss of a vote of confidence
1979
1924

New Prime Minister seeks a mandate
2019
2017
1955
1935
1931
1923

Prime Minister without a working majority seeks to gain one
2019
October 1974
1966
1951

Prime Minister's choice of date
2017 (approved by a motion of the House of Commons under the provisions of the Fixed-term Parliaments Act 2011)
2005
2001
1987
1983
February 1974
1970
1959
1950
1929

Parliament had run its course
2015
2010
1997
1992
1964

Collapse of cooperation within Government
1922

End of World War
1945
1918

Miscellaneous records

Incumbents fall directly from first place to fourth place

1 UUP had been unopposed by DUP at previous elections.
2 Sitting Labour MP stood instead for the Independent Labour Party and took second place.

Incumbents fall directly from first place to third place

1 The sitting Labour MP had defected to the SDP in 1981.
2 The sitting Ulster Unionist Party MP had defected to sit as an Independent Unionist.
3 The sitting Independent Labour Party MP had defected to Labour.

Outgoing Government gains seats
When there is a decisive change in electoral sentiment, a tiny number of seats will not only buck the trend by not moving as expected, but may actually move in the opposite direction. Only elections that saw a change of government are listed, since it is fairly common for a few seats to move in divergent directions when an incumbent government is re-elected; 2005 was an exception to this case, when the Labour party scored no gains.

Italics indicates seat was regained after having been lost in a previous by-election

Incoming Government loses seats 
Notes: In 2010 the Conservatives entered government as the largest party in a coalition and in 2015 they went from being part of a coalition to being a majority government in their own right.
In 2017 the Conservatives entered government without an overall majority and in 2019 they went from having a minority government to being a majority government in their own right.

In 2010 the Liberal Democrats entered government as a junior partner in a coalition.

Italics indicates seat was previously lost at a by-election and not regained by the incoming government at a general election

Seats gained from fourth place*
Argyll and Bute, 2015 gained by SNP from the Liberal Democrats
Edinburgh West, 2015 gained by SNP from the Liberal Democrats
Inverness East, Nairn and Lochaber, 1997 gained by Labour from the Liberal Democrats
Ceredigion and Pembroke North, 1992 gained by Plaid Cymru from the Liberals

Seats gained from third place*
North Down, 2019 gained by Alliance from an Independent
Aberdeen South, 2017 gained by the Conservatives from the SNP
Ayr, Carrick and Cumnock, 2017 gained by the Conservatives from the SNP
East Renfrewshire, 2017 gained by the Conservatives from the SNP
Gordon, 2017 gained by the Conservatives from the SNP
Ochil and South Perthshire, 2017 gained by the Conservatives from the SNP
Portsmouth South, 2017 gained by Labour from the Conservatives
Stirling, 2017 gained by the Conservatives from the SNP
Cambridge, 2015 gained by Labour from the Liberal Democrats
Belfast East, 2010 gained by Alliance from the DUP
Brighton Pavilion, 2010 gained by the Greens from Labour
Watford, 2010 gained by the Conservatives from Labour
Camborne and Redruth, 2010 gained by the Conservatives from the Liberal Democrats
Falmouth and Camborne, 2005 gained by the Liberal Democrats from Labour
Leeds North West, 2005 gained by the Liberal Democrats from Labour
Lagan Valley, 2005 gained by the DUP from the UUP 1
West Tyrone, 2001 gained by Sinn Féin from the UUP
Sittingbourne and Sheppey, 1997 gained by Labour from the Conservatives
Shrewsbury and Atcham, 1997 gained by Labour from the Conservatives
St. Albans, 1997 gained by Labour from the Conservatives
Oldham East and Saddleworth, 1997 gained by Labour from the Conservatives 2
Leeds North West, 1997 gained by Labour from the Conservatives
Hastings and Rye, 1997 gained by Labour from the Conservatives
Falmouth and Camborne, 1997 gained by Labour from the Conservatives
Conwy, 1997 gained by Labour from the Conservatives
Bristol West, 1997 gained by Labour from the Conservatives
Aberdeen South, 1997 gained by Labour from the Conservatives
Mid Ulster, 1997 gained by Sinn Féin from the DUP
Cambridge, 1992 gained by Labour from the Conservatives
Plymouth Devonport, 1992 gained by Labour from the SDP
Clwyd South West, 1987 gained by Labour from the Conservatives
Edinburgh South, 1987 gained by Labour from the Conservatives
Strathkelvin and Bearsden, 1987 gained by Labour from the Conservatives
Renfrew West and Inverclyde, 1987 gained by Labour from the Conservatives
Colne Valley, 1983 gained by the Liberals from Labour
Leeds West, 1983 gained by the Liberals from Labour
Southwark and Bermondsey, 1983 gained by the Liberals from Labour 3
Liverpool Mossley Hill, 1983 gained by the Liberals from the Conservatives
Ross, Cromarty and Skye, 1983 gained by the SDP from the Conservatives 4
East Dunbartonshire, 1979 gained by Labour from the SNP
Lincoln, 1979 gained by the Conservatives from Labour
East Dunbartonshire, October 1974 gained by the SNP from the Conservatives
Clackmannan and East Stirlingshire, February 1974 gained by the SNP from Labour
Isle of Wight, February 1974 gained by the Liberals from the Conservatives
Ross and Cromarty, 1970 gained by the Conservatives from the Liberals
Ross and Cromarty, 1964 gained by the Liberals from the National Liberals

Notes:
* only includes examples of genuine three-or-more party competition; does not include seats gained as a result of pacts
1 sitting member had defected from UUP to DUP
2 Liberal Democrats had won a by-election in predecessor constituency in which Labour finished second
3 by-election gain confirmed at general election.
4 SDP candidate ran for the Alliance in seat with strong Liberal tradition.

General election victors had not contested previous election

It is unusual for a party that had not contested the seat at the previous election to win it. Since the major mainland parties now routinely contest all seats, except the Speaker's, such rare victories tend to come from independents or splinter-parties.

Fermanagh and South Tyrone, 2015, Ulster Unionist Tom Elliott
Blaenau Gwent, 2005: Independent Peter Law
Bethnal Green and Bow, 2005: Respect, George Galloway
Wyre Forest, 2001: IKHH, Richard Taylor
North Down, 19973: UKUP, Robert McCartney
Tatton, 1997: Independent Martin Bell
Caithness and Sutherland, 1983: SDP, Robert Maclennan
Belfast West, 1983: Sinn Féin, Gerry Adams
Mid Ulster, 1983: Democratic Unionist, William McCrea
Belfast East, 1979: Democratic Unionist, Peter Robinson
Belfast South, 1979:1 Ulster Unionist, Robert Bradford
Mid Ulster, 1979:2 United Ulster Unionist, John Dunlop
Lincoln, February 19743: Democratic Labour, Dick Taverne
North Antrim, February 19744: DUP, Ian Paisley
Belfast West, February 19745: SDLP, Gerry Fitt
Belfast East, February 1974: Vanguard, William Craig
Belfast South, February 1974: Vanguard, Robert Bradford
Mid Ulster, February 1974: Vanguard, John Dunlop
North Antrim, 1970: PUP, Ian Paisley
Mid Ulster, 1970: Unity, Bernadette Devlin
Western Isles, 1970: SNP, Donald Stewart
Caithness and Sutherland, 1964: Liberal, George Mackie

Notes:
1 Vanguard broke up in the late 1970s; the sitting MP joined the Ulster Unionists.
2 Vanguard broke up in the late 1970s; the sitting MP joined the United Ulster Unionists.
3 By-election gain confirmed at the general election.
4 The Protestant Unionist Party merged into the Democratic Unionist Party in 1970.
5 Sitting MP Gerry Fitt had left the Republican Labour Party for the SDLP in 1970; by 1974 Republican Labour had disintegrated.

Incumbent party did not contest
The rare occasions where the party which won the previous election did not contest the seat. Independent candidates are not included, nor are Speakers of the House or Commons. Also excluded are occasions where the party had merged into an organisation which did contest the election, such as when the Social Democratic Party and Liberal Party formed the Liberal Democrats, or the Vanguard Unionist Progressive Party merged into the Ulster Unionist Party.

Major party did not run

Conservative
Chorley, 20191
Buckingham, 20171
Buckingham, 20151
Buckingham, 20101
Glasgow North East, 20051
Glasgow Springburn, 20011
West Bromwich West, 19971
Croydon North East, 19871
Cardiff West, 19791
Wirral, October 19741
Wirral, February 19741
Greenock, 1970
Huddersfield West, 1959
Pembrokeshire, 1955
Carmarthen, 1955
Huddersfield West, 1955
Carmarthen, 1951
Colne Valley, 1951
Huddersfield West, 1951
Carmarthen, 1950
Huddersfield West, 1950

Labour
Chorley, 20191
Buckingham, 20171
Buckingham, 20151
Buckingham, 20101
Glasgow North East, 20051
Glasgow Springburn, 20011
West Bromwich West, 19971
Tatton, 1997
Cardiff West, 19791
Chelmsford, 1945
Woodford, 1945

Liberal Democrats
Arfon, 20192P
Beaconsfield, 20192I
Brighton Pavilion, 20192G
Bristol West, 20192G
Broxtowe, 20192I
Bury St Edmunds, 20192G
Caerphilly, 20192P
Cannock Chase, 20192G
Carmarthen East and Dinefwr, 20192P
Chorley, 20191
Dulwich and West Norwood, 20192G
Dwyfor Meirionnydd, 20192P
Exeter, 20192G
Forest of Dean, 20192G
Isle of Wight, 20192G
Llanelli, 20192P
Luton South, 20192I
Pontypridd, 20192P
Stroud, 20192G
Vale of Glamorgan, 20192G
Ynys Môn, 20192P
Buckingham, 20171
Brighton Pavilion, 2017
Skipton and Ripon, 2017
Buckingham, 20151
Buckingham, 20101
Glasgow North East, 20051
Wyre Forest, 2005
Glasgow Springburn, 20011
Wyre Forest, 2001
West Bromwich West, 19971
Tatton, 1997

Liberal Party (pre-Liberal Democrats)
Birmingham Handsworth, 1979
Cardiff West, 19791
Dudley West, 1979
Ormskirk, 1979
Salford East, 1979
Woodford, 1945

1: An occasion where a major party stood aside against the Speaker of the House of Commons.
2: As part of the Unite to Remain pact, the Liberal Democrats stood aside in favour of Green (2G), Plaid Cymru (2P) and independent (2I) candidates in some seats.

Victories by minor parties
Victories by independent and minor party candidates since 1945. For a complete list, see the list of UK minor party and independent MPs elected.

Independent candidates winning 10% or more
Independent candidates who did not win, but took 10% or more of the vote in their constituency

Minor parties other strong performance
Parties without representation in Parliament which won 10% or more of the votes cast:

Miscellaneous notable results

Party leaders or deputy leaders losing their seats

1: McCarthy was defeated in Londonderry City, the seat for which he had sat in the previous Parliament. He also stood in North Longford, where he was elected.
2: Gladstone was defeated in South West Lancashire, the seat for which he had sat in the previous Parliament. He also stood in Greenwich, where he was elected.

General elections having historic significance
2019: The first general election that had a particular Act of Parliament to trigger it.
2017: The first general election following the vote to leave the European Union and the subsequent invocation of Article 50. The first early general election to be held under the Fixed-term Parliaments Act.
2010: The first Coalition government to arise from a general election result.
1997: Blair, New Labour
1979: Thatcher, end of the post-war consensus
1945: Labour, Welfare State
1931: National Government presides over the Great Depression and Appeasement
1923: First Labour government emerges
1910 (two Liberal general election victories) Establishment of supremacy of the Commons. The Parliament Act 1911.
1906: Liberal landslide

First general elections for a new political party
Listed below parties which have returned MPs, either at the listed election or a later one.

2005: Respect Party
2001: Independent Community and Health Concern
1997: UK Independence Party*
1997: UK Unionist Party (in Northern Ireland)
1992: Liberal Democrats
1992: Green Party of England and Wales*
1983: SDP
1983: Ulster Popular Unionist Party (in Northern Ireland)
1979: Scottish Labour Party (only time – formed 1976, dissolved 1981)
February 1974: Alliance Party (in Northern Ireland)*
February 1974: Democratic Labour Party
February 1974: Democratic Unionist Party (in Northern Ireland)
February 1974: SDLP (in Northern Ireland)
February 1974: Vanguard Unionist Progressive Party (in Northern Ireland)
1966: Republican Labour Party (in Northern Ireland – dissolved 1973)
1945: Common Wealth Party (only time)
1935: Scottish National Party*
1931: National Labour Party
1931: Empire Free Trade Crusade (only time)
1931: National Liberal Party (dissolved 1968)
1929: Plaid Cymru (in Wales)*
1922: Communist Party
1922: National Liberal Party (only time – dissolved 1923)
1922: Ulster Unionist Party (in Northern Ireland)
1918: National Democratic and Labour Party (only time – dissolved 1922)
1918: National Party (only time – formed 1917, dissolved 1921)
1918: National Socialist Party (only time – became Social Democratic Federation 1919)
1918: Sinn Féin (in Ireland)
1918: Unionist Party (in Scotland)
January 1910: All-for-Ireland League
January 1910: Scottish Prohibition Party*
1900: Labour Party (as Labour Representative Committee – renamed 1906)
1895: Independent Labour Party
1892: Irish National Federation
1892: Irish Unionist Alliance
1886: Liberal Unionist Party
1885: Crofters Party (in Scotland)
1885: Irish Parliamentary Party (aka Irish Nationalist)
1874: Home Rule League (in Ireland)
1859: Liberal Party
1852: Independent Irish Party
1841: Chartist*
1835: Conservative Party

Asterisked – first election where party fielded candidates but MPs elected at later general election. Otherwise all parties listed returned MPs at first contested election.

Last general elections for defunct political parties
Listed below are parties which had returned MPs and which ceased to exist after the listed election:

2015: Respect Party
2001: UK Unionist Party (in Northern Ireland)
1992: Ulster Popular Unionist Party (in Northern Ireland)
1987: Communist Party
1987: Liberal Party* 
1987: SDP*
1983: United Ulster Unionist Party
1979: Democratic Labour Party
October 1974: Vanguard Unionist Progressive Party (in Northern Ireland)
February 1974: Independent Labour Party
1970: Republican Labour Party
1966: National Liberal Party (formed 1931 – dissolved 1968)
1964: Unionist Party (in Scotland)
1945: Common Wealth Party
1935: National Labour Party
1931: Scottish Prohibition Party
1918: Irish Parliamentary Party (aka Irish Nationalist)
1918: Irish Unionist Alliance
December 1910: All-for-Ireland League
December 1910: Liberal Unionist Party
1895: Crofters Party (in Scotland)
1895: Irish National Federation
1880: Home Rule League (in Ireland)
1859: Chartists
1857: Independent Irish Party
1857: Radicals (before amalgamation into Liberal Party which continued to be nicknamed "Radicals")
1857: Whig Party
1832: Tory Party (before reorganisation as Conservative Party which continued to be nicknamed "Tories")

* After the Liberal Party and SDP merged to form the Liberal Democrats, some members opposed to the merger formed new parties, the continuation Liberal Party and continuation Social Democratic Party. These parties are legally distinct from their predecessors and have never won a seat in Parliament.

General elections following electoral developments
Participation in, and outcome of, general elections can be influenced by changes in electoral law or practice.

2019: first general election held because an Act of Parliament specifically called for one (the Early Parliamentary General Election Act 2019, enacted to bypass the Fixed-term Parliaments Act 2011)
2017: first general election held because MPs voted for an early election under the Fixed-term Parliaments Act 2011
2015: first general election scheduled automatically under the Fixed-term Parliaments Act 2011
2010: first general election following lowering of age of candidacy to 18
2001: first general election in which hereditary peers could vote, and stand as MPs without disclaiming peerage
1970: first general election following reduction of adult voting age to 18
1964: first general election hereditary peers were allowed to stand as MPs if peerage disclaimed
1955: first general election in which all seats were contested
1950: first general election following:
extension of postal voting to civilian population
abolition of university constituencies
abolition of plural voting
abolition of remaining two-member seat constituencies
1929: first general election where all adult women (aged 21 upwards) were enfranchised
1922: first general election following secession of Southern Ireland from the UK
1918: first general election in which:
women (aged 21 upwards) were eligible only to stand and (aged 30 upwards) were enfranchised
all adult males (aged 21 upwards) were enfranchised
polling was held on single day
postal voting (for armed forces personnel) was allowed
1885: first general election held subject to the Corrupt and Illegal Practices Prevention Act 1883
1874: first general election held with secret ballots
1868: first general election following enfranchisement of all male heads of household under the Second Reform Act
1832: first general election following Great Reform Act which:
established a unified householder franchise
comprehensively redistributed parliamentary seats, abolishing many rotten boroughs
established 21 years as the youngest age of candidacy (reduced to 18 in 2006)
1830: first general election in which Roman Catholics could stand as MPs (significant in Ireland)
1801: first general election in which Irish voters elected MPs to Westminster, following the Act of Union, on same footing to those in England, Scotland and Wales

See also
List of United Kingdom MPs with the shortest service
Records of members of parliament of the United Kingdom
Swing (politics)
United Kingdom by-election records
United Kingdom European Parliament election records
United Kingdom general elections overview

Notes

References

 Who's Who of British MPs: Volume IV, 1945–1979 by Michael Stenton and Stephen Lees (Harvester, Brighton, 1979) 
 British Parliamentary Constituencies – A Statistical Compendium by Ivor Crewe and Anthony Fox (Faber and Faber, London, 1984) 
 British Political Facts 1900–1994 by David Butler and Gareth Butler (St. Martin's Press, New York, 1994) 

Records
General Election
General election